Rostherne is a civil parish and village in the unitary authority of Cheshire East and the ceremonial county of Cheshire, England.

To the north of the village is Rostherne Mere and to the south is Tatton Park.  The A556 road passes to its west.

History
In the 11th century Rostherene was called Rodestorne, said to mean the Lake of the Holy Cross, from the Anglo-Saxon Rodes, meaning cross and the northern word torne or tarne meaning lake. At the time of the Domesday Book the parish belonged to Gilbert de Venables, Baron of Kinderton, who displaced Ulviet the Saxon as owner of the lands, although there was then only one rateable field in the parish, one team and two acres of wood, the whole only being worth four shillings a year. By 1286 almost all of Rostherne had become part of the Tatton estate, having been sold to Massey of Tatton, except for a portion retained by the Leghs.

Buildings
St Mary's Church, Rostherne, is a Grade I listed building, whose rectory was for many centuries in the possession of the Leighs of West Hall, High Legh.

Notable people
Michael Wrigley (1924-1995), first-class cricketer, British Army officer and civil servant

See also

Listed buildings in Rostherne

References

External links

Villages in Cheshire
Civil parishes in Cheshire